The Cuerpo de Investigaciones Científicas, Penales y Criminalísticas (Scientific, Criminal and Criminalistic Investigation Service Corps, CICPC) is Venezuela's largest national police agency, responsible for criminal investigations and forensic services. It replaced the Cuerpo Técnico de Policía Judicial (PTJ) in 2001.

See also 
 Law enforcement in Venezuela
 2017 Caracas helicopter attack

References

External links
  CICPC

Law enforcement agencies of Venezuela
Organizations established in 2001
2001 establishments in Venezuela